Nasrabad-e Pasha (also Romanized as Naşrābād-e Pāshā; also known as Naşrābād) is a village in Fathabad Rural District, in the Central District of Qasr-e Shirin County, Kermanshah Province, Iran. At the 2006 census, its population was 89, in 19 families.

References 

Populated places in Qasr-e Shirin County